The Bossu Revolver was a Velo-dog revolver of Belgian origin.

Manufacture d’armes Lepage produced one, as did HDH.

References 
Notes

Sources
 

Revolvers of Belgium